The Bower House is a grade I listed Palladian mansion in Havering-atte-Bower, England. It was built in 1729 by Henry Flitcroft. The stable block is separately grade I listed. It incorporated architectural items salvaged from the ruined Havering Palace. It remained a private home until 1976 when it was purchased by the Ford Motor Company. It is currently used as a Christian training centre. It forms part of the Open House London weekend.

References

Houses completed in 1729
Grade I listed buildings in the London Borough of Havering
Houses in the London Borough of Havering
Grade I listed houses in London
1729 establishments in England
Country houses in London